Madlitz-Wilmersdorf is a former municipality in the Oder-Spree district, in Brandenburg, Germany. It is situated at the Spree river, southwest of Berlin. Since 1 January 2014, it is part of the municipality Briesen.

References

Localities in Oder-Spree
Former municipalities in Brandenburg